Mahmudiye is a village in the Ezine District of Çanakkale Province in Turkey. Its population is 1,253 (2021). Before the 2013 reorganisation, it was a town (belde).

References

Villages in Ezine District